Zabag (Indonesian: Sabak; Chinese: 阇婆 or 闍婆 "She-bó", "Shepo"; Sanskrit: Javaka; Tamil: சாவகம் "Savakam"; Arabic: الزابج "Zabaj"; Latin: Jabad) is thought to have been an ancient kingdom located south of China somewhere in Southeast Asia, between the Chenla Kingdom (now Cambodia) and Java. Several historians have  associated this kingdom with Srivijaya and thought its location was somewhere in Sumatra, Java or Malay Peninsula. Indonesian historians have suggested that Zabag is connected to the present day Muara Sabak area, the estuary of Batang Hari River in East Tanjung Jabung Regency, Jambi province. Zabag could also have been located in Java, not Srivijaya because Zabag is noted to annex Srivijaya, and the size of Zabag is only half the size of an island called Ramni (Sumatra).

Samuel Bochart suggested that Jabad is the island of Iabadiu as mentioned by Ptolemy; it's reads ἰαβαδίου, thas is iaba-diu, or the island of Java. He argue that "iaba diu" means the island of barley, and the word "iaba" is based on the Arabic word jabad or aibad, by which is signified a grass or a grain of barley intended for fattening cattle. Bochart also argue that the correct interpretaion of Iabadiu is νῆσος (nesos, islands) not νήσου (nísou, island). On critical edition of Stephanus of Byzantium, Abraham Berkelius argue that the island of Iabadiu, as presented by Ptolemy, is Iaba diu, or the island of Java; and for the Persians and Indians there is no one who does not know that "diu" denotes the island, and "iaba" signifies grass or grain of barley.

Its exact location, however, is still the subject of debate among scholars. Other possible locations such as northern Borneo and Philippines have also been suggested.

Historical sources
The main source of the existence of the kingdom of Zabag was a Persian sailor named Sulaiman al-Tajir al-Sirafi, known as Sulaiman the Merchant, in his book "Rihlah As-Sirafiy" (As-Sirafi's journey), in which he recorded his journey to India, China, and the Zabaj islands in the period 851 AD. Following are excerpts of Sulaiman al-Tajir al-Sirafi's journey: Then we will discuss the city of Zabaj, which separates from China. Between the two [Zabaj and China] can be reached by sea travel for a month, or less if the wind is good; it is said to be around 900 farsakh. The king is known as "maharaja" (''al-maharij''). The maharaja is in control of the many islands so that the total power can reach 1000 Farsakhs or more. And in its territory there is an island which is the center of its kingdom, as told in the length of about 400 Farsakhs. There is also an island known as "Al-Rami" (Land of Arrows) which is about 800 farsakh in length; there are plants such as red wood, camphor, and others. And in its territory there is an island [Singapore] which is a crossing between Chinese lands and Arab lands. And the estimated distance is 80 farsakhs. And to him collected merchandise such as rattan, camphor, sandalwood, ivory, tin, ebony, red wood, and various spices, and others whose list will be very long. And at this time the journey from Oman to there and from there to Oman has already taken place. The maharaja's orders apply throughout the islands and also the mainland, and its main area is where it is located.

The Maharaja controlled all of these islands. As for the island, where he lives, is a very fertile and densely populated island. Someone who can be trusted says, when roosters start crowing at dawn, as is the case in Arab lands, they will reply within more than 100 farsakhs. This can happen because the villages are interconnected and because there are no deserts or ruins, they line up continuously. People who travel by foot or horse in this country can go wherever he likes. If he is tired, he can stop wherever he likes, and he can always find a place to stay. ("Rihlah As-Sirafiy", Sulaiman al-Tajir al-Sirafi)Many scholars identify Srivijaya empire with the Arabic Zabaj, which most scholars agree in equating it with Javaka (in Pali texts), that also appeared in Indian sources. According to a Sri Lankan source, king Chandrabhanu Sridhamaraja is one of Javakan kings from Tambralinga kingdom, who had invaded Sri Lanka in 1247. However, the term Javaka was not occurred here for the first time, the term has been used vaguely to identify a polity in Southeast Asia.

The naval prowess of the Maharaja of Zabaj had played a major role in forming a legend recorded by Sulaimaan, an Arabic merchant in 851, and published by Masoudi, a historian, in his 947 book "Meadows of Gold and Mines of Gems." He described the story of one proud Khmer king who foolishly defied the power of the Maharaja of Zabaj.

Legend of the Maharaja of Zabaj
One day in a fit of jealousy, the Khmer ruler made the following remark in court.

"I have one desire that I would like to satisfy," said the young ruler.

"What is that desire, O King," inquired his faithful councillor.

"I wish to see before me on a plate," remarked the monarch, "the head of the King of Zabaj."

"I do not wish, O King, that my sovereign should express such a desire,” answered the minister. “The Khmer and Zabaj have never manifested hatred towards each other, either in words or in acts. Zabaj has never done us any harm. What the King has said should not be repeated."

Angered by this sage advice, the Khmer ruler raised his voice and repeated his desire so that all of the generals and nobles who were present at court could hear him. Word of the young ruler's impetuous outburst passed from mouth to mouth until it finally arrived at the court of the Maharaja of Zabaj. Upon hearing the words of the Khmer ruler, the Maharaja ordered his councillor to prepare a thousand ships for departure. When the fleet was ready, the Maharaja himself went aboard and announced to the crowd on shore that he would be making a pleasure trip amongst his islands. Once at sea, however, the Maharaja orders the armada to proceed to the capital of the Khmer ruler, where his troops took the Khmers by surprise, seized the city, and surrounded the palace. After the Khmer ruler had been captured, he was brought before the Maharaja of Zabaj.

"What caused you to form a desire which was not in your power to satisfy, which would not have given you happiness if you had realized it, and would not even have been justified if it had been easily realizable?" inquired the Maharaja of Zabaj.

Since the Khmer king had nothing to say in return, the Maharaja of Zabaj continued. "You have manifested the desire to see before you my head on a plate. If you also had wished to seize my country and my kingdom or even only to ravage a part of it, I would have done the same to you. But since you have only expressed the first of these desires, I am going to apply to you the treatment you wished to apply to me, and I will then return to my country without taking anything belonging to the Khmer, either of great or small value."

When the Maharaja returned to his own palace back home, he seated himself on the throne. Set before him was a plate upon which rested the head of the former Khmer king.

Sayabiga 
Numerous Arabic sources noted the existence of a people called Sayabiga, which are already settled on the shores of the Persian Gulf before the rise of Islam. This tribe or group appears to have been derived from a colony of Sumatran or Javanese people, originally settled in Sind, but who were eventually made prisoners during a Persian invasion and forcibly enrolled in the Persian military forces. Sayabiga were mercenaries of high soldierly qualities, disciplined, used to the sea, faithful servants; and in consequence, they were considered eminently suitable to serve as guards and soldiers, gaolers, and wardens of the treasury. In the reign of Caliph Abu Bakr (632–634) they formed a garrison at At-Khatt, in Al-Bahrain, and in 656 they are recorded as having been entrusted with the guarding of the treasury at Al-Basra. Ferrand (1926) shows that the name Sayabiga is derived directly from Sabag, which is a variation of Zabag.

Location

Srivijaya
Many historian identify Zabag with Srivijaya, an empire centered in Sumatra. Zabag is the Arabic word for Sumatra and Java, roughly corresponding with the Srivijaya. A French scholar, George Coedès, published his discoveries and interpretations in Dutch and Indonesian-language newspapers. Coedès noted that the Chinese references to "Sanfoqi" or "Sanfotsi", previously read as "Sribhoja", and the inscriptions in Old Malay refer to the same empire. This contradicts the opinion of Mulyana and Lombard, who identified Sanfotsi and Sanfoqi as Srivijaya / Sumatra, in contrast to Java.

Srivijaya and by extension Sumatra had been known by different names to different peoples. The Chinese called it Sanfotsi, and at one time there was an even older kingdom of Kantoli that could be considered as the predecessor of Srivijaya. In Sanskrit and Pali, it was referred to as Yavadesh and Javadeh respectively. The Arabs called it Zabag and the Khmer called it Melayu. This is another reason why the discovery of Srivijaya was so difficult. While some of these names are strongly reminiscent of the name of Java, there is a distinct possibility that they may have referred to Sumatra instead.

The opinion that states Zabag as Srivijaya has incomplete evidence. Because Zabag has other names namely Javaka and Yavadesh. It is linguistically very unlikely if a large kingdom like Srivijaya is called with other words which refer to the country opposite. In addition, the records about Zabag also mention the words Sribuja and Ramni. The term Sribuja is closer to Srivijaya, which was one of Zabag's territories. If it is associated with the Ligor B inscription in Southern Thailand, it has very strongly emphasized the period of Javanese domination over Srivijaya. This happened when the Mataram Kingdom was led by Rakai Panangkaran. In addition, other evidence that Zabag is called Java and Sribuja is southern Sumatra is the change in the dynasty that ruled Srivijaya. The Srivijaya kingdom which was fostered by Dapunta Hyang was replaced by the leadership of the Syailendra dynasty who came from Java. Even if it is associated with the Nalada inscription, it is very clear that Balaputradewa is King Suwarnadwipa who is the grandson of King Yawabhumi. This confirms that Zabag refers to Java at this time. In addition, Zabag is connoted as fertile land and is closely related to volcanic soil in the Mataram kingdom. The term Zabag also connotes a different island with one of its territories, Ramni. The Ramni Kingdom itself is located on the northern part of Sumatra Island (Lamuri). This confirms that Zabag is not Srivijaya and is currently on the island of Java.

Java 
Sulayman around 851 AD noted that Sribuza (Srivijaya) and Kalah (a place on the Malay peninsula, possibly Kedah) were the area ruled by Zabag. Therefore, the intended Zabag is not Srivijaya. Ibn Khordazbeh in 844, Ibn Al-Fakih in 902, Abu Zayd Hasan in 943, and Sulayman in 851 AD noted that Zabag united Sribuza and Kalah. During this period, Java was ruled by Mataram Kingdom.

From other Arabic information, the kingdom of Zabag is as far as 20 days of voyage from the Kalah. According to Abu'lfida' information, the distance between Kalah and the central state of Java was 20 days of journey. The distance is the same as the distance from Malacca to Majapahit as recorded by The Epic of Hang Tuah. According to Nugroho, this indicates that Zabag is Java, not Sumatra or the Malay peninsula. He also noted several important points: Sulayman mentioned that Zabaj is only half the length of Al-Rami island, which indicates that Zabaj is Java while Al-Rami is Sumatra. The island on which the Maharaja resided was very fertile and densely populated, which corresponds to Java. It is also possible that She-pó or She-bó in Chinese records, which is the original name of the island of Java (Javadvipa is the Sanskrit word for the island), is Zabag.

When John of Marignolli returned from China to Avignon, he stayed at the Kingdom of Saba for a few months, which he said had many elephants and was led by a queen. Saba may be his interpretation of She-bó. Afanasij Nikitin, a merchant from Tver (in Russia), travelled to India in 1466 and described the land of Java, which he called  (/).

The word Saba in Kawi Javanese  means "meeting" or "assembly," so the name could be interpreted as "meeting place". According to Fahmi Basya, the word means "assembly place", "meeting place", or "meeting place of nations".

See also
Sanfotsi
Waqwaq

Notes

References

External links
 The Medieval Geography of Sanfotsi and Zabag

Precolonial states of Indonesia
History of Malaysia
Song dynasty
Srivijaya
Mythological islands
History of Indonesia
Former kingdoms
Mataram Kingdom